Bartlewo may refer to the following places:
Bartlewo, Kuyavian-Pomeranian Voivodeship (north-central Poland)
Bartlewo, Warmian-Masurian Voivodeship (north Poland)
Bartlewo, West Pomeranian Voivodeship (north-west Poland)